Ewa Laurance (formerly Ewa Svensson & Mataya, born February 26, 1964) is a Swedish professional pool player, most notably on the Women's Professional Billiard Association nine-ball tour, a sports writer, and more recently a sports commentator for ESPN. In 2004, she was inducted into the Billiard Congress of America's Hall of Fame.  She has been nicknamed "the Leading Lady of Billiards" and "the Striking Viking".

Playing career
Laurance has been playing pool since she was 4 years old. She moved to the United States in 1981 at 17 years old, after competing in the 1980 WPBA World Straight Pool Championship in New York City. In 1983, she became the first female European player to win a professional pool event in the United States, winning the Clyde Childress 9-Ball Open.

Laurance has won numerous major women's pool titles, including the WPA World Nine-ball Championship, WPBA U.S. Open 9-Ball Championship, WPBA National Championship, International Trick Shot Challenge and the European Pool Championship 14.1.

In 2005, Laurance bested three of her peers, WPBA Tour members Allison Fisher, Dawn Hopkins, and Gerda Hofstatter, at the Women's Trick Shot Challenge held at the New York Hotel Casino in Las Vegas, Nevada, pocketing US$25,000 as the grand prize.  Animated and expressive, she played to the audience and the cameras, "a true showperson in her element and a wonderful example to all trick shot artists."

Television
She was the co-host of the GSN original game show Ballbreakers. She has hosted the Ultimate Pool Party on ESPN. She has also been a model, appearing in TV commercials for No Nonsense brand pantyhose, and appeared on National Bingo Night on June 1, 2007. She frequently acts as a color commentator on ESPN telecasts of nine-ball tournaments, usually along with her husband Mitchell Laurance.  She has recently been featured on commercials featuring Dick's Pawn Shop in Myrtle Beach, SC.

Writing
She has authored three books: The Ewa Mataya Pool Guide (paperback), The Complete Idiot's Guide to Pool & Billiards (paperback), and Quick Start Guide to Pocket Billiards (paperback). She has also written monthly columns for Pool & Billiard magazine.

Personal life
In 1982, she married the professional pool player Jimmy Mataya, forming pool's first "power couple". They later divorced, with Ewa retaining the surname Mataya, as she was already professionally well known by this name. They have a daughter, Nikki, born in 1985.

In 1994, she married actor Mitch Laurance, later also pool commentator for ESPN and twin brother of actor Matthew Laurance.

Titles and achievements
 1981 European Pool Championship 14.1
 1983 Clyde Childress 9-Ball Open	
 1984 Clyde Childress 9-Ball Open	
 1984 Midwest 9-Ball Open
 1984 Milwaukee Doubles Cup 
 1985 Michigan 9-Ball Open
 1985 Midwest 9-Ball Open
 1987 Brunswick 9-Ball Team Challenge - with (Mike Sigel)
 1988 WPBA U.S. Open 9-Ball Championship
 1990 Cleveland Spring Open	
 1990 East Coast 9-Ball Classic	
 1990 Sands Regency 9-Ball Open
 1990 Cleveland Fall Open
 1990 Rocket City Invitational	
 1990 Billiards Digest Player of the Year
 1991 WPBA U.S. Open 9-Ball Championship
 1991 WPBA National Championship
 1994 WPA World 9-Ball Championship
 1995 WPBA Houston Classic 
 1998 WPBA Brunswick Boston Classic	
 2004 Billiard Congress of America Hall of Fame
 2005 International Trick Shot Challenge	
 2007 World Cup of Trick Shots 
 2008 WPBA Hall of Fame
 2012 WPBA Masters

References

External links
 Her official web site
 "Ewa Mataya Laurance" profile, at the Internet Movie Database
 Ewa Laurance instruction column at poolmag.com

Swedish pool players
American pool players
Swedish emigrants to the United States
Trick shot artists
1964 births
Living people
Female pool players
People from Gävle
World champions in pool
American sportswomen
21st-century American women
Sportspeople from Gävleborg County